Megachile tuberculata is a species of bee in the family Megachilidae. It was described by Smith in 1857, and occurs in SE Asia and Oceania.

References

tuberculata
Insects described in 1857